Frans Krajcberg (12 April 1921 – 15 November 2017) was a Polish-born Brazilian painter, sculptor, engraver and photographer. Known for his environmental activism, Krajcberg denounced the destruction of the Brazilian forests, using materials such as burnt wood from illegal forest fires in his artworks.

Biography
A Polish Jew, Krajcberg was born in Kozienice in 1921. He fought in the Polish Army during World War II. After the war, Krajcberg sought refuge in the Soviet Union, where he studied engineering and art at the Leningrad State University. He then studied in Germany at the State Academy of Fine Arts Stuttgart, where he was a student of Willi Baumeister. Krajcberg came to Brazil in 1948 and participated in the eighth São Paulo Biennial in 1951. During the 1940s he produced abstract art. From 1948 to 1954 he traveled between Paris, Ibiza and Rio de Janeiro, where he made his first nature-based art works. 

In 1956, Krajcberg moved to Rio de Janeiro, where he shared a studio with the sculptor Franz Weissmann. He became a naturalized Brazilian the following year. In 1964, Krajcberg made his first sculptures with cedar wood. He made several trips to the Amazon Forest and Pantanal, photographing and documenting deforestation, as well as gathering materials for his works, like roots and charred tree trunks. In the 1970s his burnt wood sculptures received international attention.

Sítio Natura

Krajcberg lived in the south of Bahia from 1972 on, where he kept his studio on the Sítio Natura farm in Nova Viçosa.

Death
Krajcberg died on 15 November 2017, aged 96, at the Hospital Samaritano in Rio de Janeiro.

See also 
 List of Brazilian painters

References

External links 
 Frans Krajcberg profile on Itaú Cultural.

1921 births
2017 deaths
Brazilian environmentalists
Naturalized citizens of Brazil
Brazilian sculptors
Brazilian photographers
Brazilian engravers
Polish emigrants to Brazil
Brazilian Jews
Jewish painters
Jewish sculptors
Polish military personnel
People from Kozienice
Brazilian painters
Brazilian people of Polish-Jewish descent